Andorra participated in the 2010 Summer Youth Olympics in Singapore.

The Andorran team consisted of 4 athletes competing in 3 sports: aquatics (swimming), athletics and judo.

Medalists

Athletics

Note: The athletes who do not have a "Q" next to their Qualification Rank advance to a non-medal ranking final.

Girls
Track and road events

Judo

Individual

Team

Swimming

References

External links
Competitors List: Andorra

Nations at the 2010 Summer Youth Olympics
2010 in Andorran sport
Andorra at the Youth Olympics